The canton of Fouesnant is an administrative division of the Finistère department, northwestern France. Its borders were modified at the French canton reorganisation which came into effect in March 2015. Its seat is in Fouesnant.

It consists of the following communes:
 
Bénodet
Clohars-Fouesnant
Ergué-Gabéric
La Forêt-Fouesnant
Fouesnant
Gouesnach
Pleuven
Saint-Évarzec

See also
Fouesnant

References

Cantons of Finistère